Ninth Air Force may refer to:

The current Ninth Air Force, responsible for U.S. air operations in the middle east and known from 2009 to 2020 as United States Air Forces Central Command
The former Ninth Air Force (2009–2020), in existence from 2009 to 2020